"Beans, Beans, The Musical Fruit" is a playground saying and children's song about the capacity for beans to contribute to flatulence.

The basis of the song (and bean/fart humor in general) is the high amount of oligosaccharides present in beans. Bacteria in the large intestine digest these sugars, producing carbon dioxide, hydrogen and methane.  These gases are expelled from the body as flatulence.

Lyrics

Popular culture
A version of the rhyme appears at the beginning of Robert Crumb's comic strip, "Crybaby's Blues".
In The Simpsons season 4 episode 20 "Whacking Day," Bart performs a rendition of "Beans, Beans, the Musical Fruit."
The American bean brand Bush Brothers and Company wrote a related song with the singer Josh Groban. The lyrics include a direct reference to the rhyme: "They'd yell about the musical fruit // They'd say the more that I ate, the more I'd (toot)".
In a "Dot's Poetry Corner" segment of Animaniacs, Dot recites a variation entitled "Ode to a Veggie", that goes "Beans, beans, the musical fruit / The more you eat, the more they kick you off the air if you finish this poem."

General references
Dawson, Jim. Who Cut the Cheese?: A Cultural History of the Fart,

References

American folk songs
English children's songs
Playground songs
Flatulence in popular culture